The 1958 Calgary Stampeders finished in 4th place in the W.I.F.U. with a 6–9–1 record and failed to make the playoffs.

Regular season

Season standings

Season schedule

Awards and records
 CFL's Most Outstanding Lineman Award – Don Luzzi (OT/DT)

References

Calgary Stampeders seasons
1958 Canadian Football League season by team